Below is a list of the speakers of the Parliament of Aruba.

Sources 
 http://www.parlamento.aw/index.php?mediumid=1&pagid=134 

Estates, Presidents
Aruba, Estates